The 2015 BYU Cougars baseball team represented Brigham Young University in the 2015 NCAA Division I baseball season.  Mike Littlewood acted in his 3rd season as head coach of the Cougars. For the second consecutive year BYU was picked to finish sixth in the WCC Pre-season rankings. After using three stadiums last season, the Cougars played all of their home games at Larry H. Miller Field. The Cougars surpassed expectations in the 2015 season. BYU won 7 of their 9 conference series (losing series only at San Diego and at Pacific), claimed the 3-seed in the WCC Tournament, and lost 0 home series for the season. The Cougars went 0–2 in the WCC Tournament, losing both games in the ninth inning, to finish the season 28–25, 16–11 in conference play.

2015 Roster

Schedule 

! style="background:#FFFFFF;color:#002654;"| Regular Season
|- 

|- align="center" bgcolor="ffbbb"
| February 13 || at #16 UC Santa Barbara || – || Caesar Uyesaka Stadium  || None || 1–8 || Justin Jacome (1–0) || Kolton Mahoney (0–1) || None || 411 || 0–1 || –
|- align="center" bgcolor="ffbbb"
| February 14 || at #16 UC Santa Barbara || – || Caesar Uyesaka Stadium || None ||  0–6 || Dillon Tate (1–0) || Hayden Rogers (0–1) || None || 340 || 0–2 || –
|- align="center" bgcolor="ffbbb"
| February 14 || at #16 UC Santa Barbara || – || Caesar Uyesaka Stadium || None ||  1–3 || Shane Bieber (1–0) || Jeff Barker (0–1) || James Carter (1) || 380 || 0–3 || –
|- align="center" bgcolor="ffbbb"
| February 16 || at #16 UC Santa Barbara || – || Caesar Uyesaka Stadium || None ||  4–5  || Domenic Mazza (1–0) || Brady Corless (0–1) || James Carter (2) || 305 || 0–4 || –
|- align="center" bgcolor="ffbbb"
| February 19 || vs. Nebraska || – || Peoria Sports Complex || None || 3–6 || Jeff Chesnut (1–0) || Mason Marshall (0–1) || Josh Roeder (2) || 930 || 0–5 || –
|- align="center" bgcolor="ccffcc"
| February 20 || vs. Nebraska || – || Peoria Sports Complex || None || 8–3 || Jeff Barker (1–1) || Chance Sinclair (1–1) || None || 1,150 || 1–5 || –
|- align="center" bgcolor="ffbbb"
| February 20 || vs. Nebraska || – || Peoria Sports Complex || None || 1–3 (11) || Colton Howell (1–1) || Michael Rucker (0–1) || Josh Roeder (3) || 1,150 || 1–6 || –
|- align="center" bgcolor="ffbbb"
| February 21 || vs. Nebraska || – || Peoria Sports Complex || None || 1–9 || Zack Engelken (1–0) || Brady Corless (0–2) || Jake Meyers (1) || 1,914 || 1–7 || –
|- align="center" bgcolor="ffbbb"
| February 26 || vs. Oklahoma || – || Cashman Field || None || 6–7 || Jacob Evans (1–0) || Keaton Cenatiempo (0–1) || None || 100 || 1–8 || –
|- align="center" bgcolor="ccffcc"
| February 27 || vs. Oklahoma || – || Cashman Field || None || 4–3 || Michael Rucker (1–1) || Keaton Hernandez (0–1) || None || 125 || 2–8 || –
|- align="center" bgcolor="ffbbb"
| February 27 || vs. Oklahoma || – || Cashman Field || None || 2–3 || Jacob Evans (2–0) || Brandon Kinser (0–1) || None || 125 || 2–9 || –
|- align="center" bgcolor="ffbbb"
| February 28 || vs. Oklahoma || – || Cashman Field || None || 1–7  || Adam Choplick (1–1)  || Maverik Buffo (0–1) || None || 150 || 2–10 || –
|-

|- align="center" bgcolor="ccffcc"
| March 5 || Hartford || – || Larry H. Miller Field || TheW.tv  || 6–0 || Kolton Mahoney (1–1) || Kyle Gauthier (1–2) || None || 803 || 3–10 || –
|- align="center" bgcolor="ccffcc"
| March 6 || Hartford || – || Larry H. Miller Field || TheW.tv  || 8–6 || Riley Gates (1–0) || Justin Robarge (0–1) || Michael Rucker (1) || 825 || 4–10 || –
|- align="center" bgcolor="ccffcc"
| March 6 || Hartford || – || Larry H. Miller Field || TheW.tv || 20–4 || Brandon Kinser (1–1) || Jacob Mellin (0–1) || None || 825 || 5–10 || –
|- align="center" bgcolor="ccffcc"
| March 7 || Hartford || – || Larry H. Miller Field || TheW.tv  || 11–7 || Keaton Cenatiempo (1–1) || Sam Mckay (2–1) || None || 817 || 6–10 || –
|- align="center" bgcolor="ccffcc"
| March 10 || at Utah Valley || – || Brent Brown Ballpark || YouTube || 10–7 || Brady Corless (1–2) || Jake Mayer (0–2) || None || 2,213 || 7–10 || –
|- align="center" bgcolor="ffbbb"
| March 12 || Pepperdine* || – || Larry H. Miller Field || BYUtv  || 3–11 || Jackson McClelland (3–1) || Kolton Mahoney (1–2) || None || 919 || 7–11 || 0–1
|- align="center" bgcolor="ccffcc"
| March 13 || Pepperdine* || – || Larry H. Miller Field || BYUtv || 5–3 || Keaton Cenatiempo (2–1) || A. J. Puckett (2–3) || Michael Rucker (2) || 1,357 || 8–11 || 1–1 
|- align="center" bgcolor="ccffcc"
| March 14 || Pepperdine* || – || Larry H. Miller Field || BYUtv || 6–5 (10) || Michael Rucker (2–1) || Max Gamboa (1–1) || None || 1,541 || 9–11 || 2–1
|- align="center" bgcolor="ccffcc"
| March 19 || at Gonzaga* || – || Patterson Complex || TheW.tv || 6–5 || Kolton Mahoney (2–2) || Calvin Lebrun (2–3) || None || 517 || 10–11 || 3–1
|- align="center" bgcolor="ffbbb"
| March 20 || at Gonzaga* || – || Patterson Complex || TheW.tv || 6–7 || Sean-Luke Brija (1–1) || James Lengal (0–1) || David Bigelow (4) || 391 || 10–12 || 3–2
|- align="center" bgcolor="ccffcc"
| March 21 || at Gonzaga* || – || Patterson Complex || TheW.tv || 13–4 || Brandon Kinser (2–1) || Andrew Spoko (2–3) || None || 568 || 11–12 || 4–2
|- align="center" bgcolor="ffbbb"
| March 24 || at Utah || – || Smith's Ballpark || P12 Mtn || 3–9 (6) || Dylan Drachler (2–2) || Brady Corless (1–3) || None || 1,367 || 11–13 || –
|- align="center" bgcolor="ffbbb"
| March 26 || at San Diego* || – || Fowler Park || TheW.tv || 1–7 || David Hill (5–2) || Kolton Mahoney (2–3) || None || 857 || 11–14 || 4–3
|- align="center" bgcolor="ffbbb"
| March 27 || at San Diego* || – || Fowler Park || TheW.tv || 3–19 || PJ Conlon (4–1) || Jeff Barker (1–2) || None || 881 || 11–15 || 4–4
|- align="center" bgcolor="ffbbb"
| March 28 || at San Diego* || – || Fowler Park || TheW.tv || 4–13  || CJ Burdick (2–1) || Brandon Kinser (2–2) || None || 654  || 11–16 || 4–5
|- align="center" bgcolor="ccffcc"
| March 30 || at #29 San Diego State || – || Tony Gwynn Stadium || MW Net || 4–0 || Michael Rucker (3–1) || Brett Seeburger (0–1) || None || 329  || 12–16 || –
|-

|- align="center" bgcolor="ccffcc"
|April 2 || Portland* || – || Larry H. Miller Field || BYUtv || 3–2 || Kolton Mahoney (3–3) || Brandon Snyder (0–3) || Michael Rucker (3)  || 725 || 13–16 || 5–5
|- align="center" bgcolor="ffbbb"
|April 3 || Portland* || – || Larry H. Miller Field || BYUtv || 3–6 || Kurt Yinger (1–5) || Jeff Barker (1–3) || Carl Snaring (2) || 1,773 || 13–17 || 5–6
|- align="center" bgcolor="ccffcc"
|April 4 || Portland* || – || Larry H. Miller Field || TheW.tv || 9–3 || Michael Rucker (4–1) || Davis Tominaga (1–5) || None || 812 || 14–17 || 6–6
|- align="center" bgcolor="ccffcc"
|April 7 || Utah Valley || – || Larry H. Miller Field || BYUtv || 15–6|| Brandon Kinser (3–2) || Patrick Wolfe (1–4) || None || 1,344  || 15–17 || –
|- align="center" bgcolor="ccffcc"
|April 9 || at Loyola Marymount* || – || George C. Page Stadium || LMUSN || 5–3 (12) || Keaton Cenatiempo (3–1) || J.D. Busfield (2–1) || Michael Rucker (4) || 362 || 16–17 || 7–6
|- align="center" bgcolor="ccffcc"
| April 10 || at Loyola Marymount* || – || George C. Page Stadium || TheW.tv || 4–2 || Brandon Kinser (4–2) || Trevor Megill (2–3) || Michael Rucker (5) || 478 || 17–17 || 8–6
|- align="center" bgcolor="ffbbb"
| April 11 || at Loyola Marymount* || – || George C. Page Stadium || LMUSN || 2–8 || Sean Watkins (3–0) || Brady Corless (1–4) || None || 391 || 17–18 || 8–7
|- align="center" bgcolor="ffbbb"
| April 13 || at Cal State Northridge || – || Matador Field || None || 8–10 || Conner O'Neil (3–2) || Kolton Mahoney (3–4) || None || 203 || 17–19 || –
|- align="center" bgcolor="ccffcc"
| April 21 || Utah || – || Larry H. Miller Field || BYUtv || 7–6 || Brandon Kinser (5–2) || Bret Helton (2–6) || Michael Rucker (6) || 1,848 || 18–19 || –
|- align="center" bgcolor="ccffcc"
| April 23 || San Francisco* || – || Larry H. Miller Field || BYUtv || 14–4 || Kolton Mahoney (4–4) || Anthony Shew (6–4) || None || 1,361 || 19–19 || 9–7
|- align="center" bgcolor="ccffcc"
| April 24 || San Francisco* || – || Larry H. Miller Field || BYUtv || 6–5 (10) || Mason Marshall (1–1) || Travis Ulstead (1–2) || None || 1,199 || 20–19 || 10–7
|- align="center" bgcolor="ccffcc"
| April 25 || San Francisco* || – || Larry H. Miller Field || TheW.tv || 3–2 (10) || Mason Marshall (2–1) || Christian Cecilio (5–2) || None || 1,160 || 21–19 || 11–7
|- align="center" bgcolor="ccffcc"
| April 28 || at Utah Valley || – || Brent Brown Ballpark || YouTube || 5–2 || Brady Corless (2–4) || Jake Mayer (1–5) || Keaton Cenatiempo (1) || 4,240 || 22–19 || –
|- align="center" bgcolor="ffbbb"
| April 30 || at Pacific* || – || Klein Family Field || TheW.tv || 3–4 || Jake Jenkins (3–6) || Kolton Mahoney (4–5) || Vince Arobio (7) || 456 || 22–20 || 11–8
|-

|- align="center" bgcolor="ffbbb"
| May 1 || at Pacific* || – || Klein Family Field || TheW.tv || 6–11 || Sean Bennetts (1–6) || Brandon Kinser (5–3) || None || 863 || 22–21 || 11–9
|- align="center" bgcolor="ccffcc"
| May 2 || at Pacific* || – || Klein Family Field || TheW.tv || 6–4 (11) || Mason Marshall (3–1)  || Vince Arobio (1–1) || None || 445 || 23–21 || 12–9
|- align="center" bgcolor="ffbbb"
| May 7 || Saint Mary's*  || – || Larry H. Miller Field || BYUtv || 5–14 || Johnny York (7–4) || Kolton Mahoney (4–6) || None || 846 || 23–22 || 12–10
|- align="center" bgcolor="ccffcc"
| May 8 || Saint Mary's*  || – || Larry H. Miller Field || BYUtv || 17–1 || Brandon Kinser (6–3) || Corbin Burnes (6–5) || None || 1,037 || 24–22 || 13–10
|- align="center" bgcolor="#CCCCCC"
| May 9 || Saint Mary's*  || – || Larry H. Miller Field || BYUtv ||colspan=7 align=center| Cancelled due to weather- Will be made up May 18
|- align="center" bgcolor="ccffcc"
| May 12 || at Utah  || – || Smith's Ballpark || P12 || 16–6 || Keaton Cenatiempo (4–1) || Nolan Stouder (0–5) || None || 4,108 || 25–22 || –
|- align="center" bgcolor="ccffcc"
| May 14 || at Santa Clara*  || – || Stephen Schott Stadium || Santa Clara Portal || 8–5 (10) || Mason Marshall (4–1) || Josh Inouye (2–1) || None || 230 || 26–22 || 14–10
|- align="center" bgcolor="ffbbb"
| May 15 || at Santa Clara* || – || Stephen Schott Stadium || Santa Clara Portal || 7–8 || Max Kuhns (1–0) || Kolton Mahoney (4–7) || None || 373 || 26–23 || 14–11
|- align="center" bgcolor="ccffcc"
| May 16 || at Santa Clara* || – || Stephen Schott Stadium || Santa Clara Portal || 4–2 || Michael Rucker (5–1) || Steven Wilson (3–4) || Mason Marshall (1) || 280 || 27–23 || 15–11
|- align="center" bgcolor="ccffcc"
| May 18 || y-Saint Mary's* || – || Louis Guisto Field || TheW.tv || 4–3 (10) || James Lengal (1–1) || David Dellaserra (2–4) || None || 91 || 28–23 || 16–11
|- align="center" bgcolor="ffbbb"
| May 21 || vs. Pepperdine* || – || Banner Island Ballpark || TheW.tv || 7–8 || Max Gamboa (5–2) || Mason Marshall (4–2) || None || 789 || 28–24 || –
|- align="center" bgcolor="ffbbb"
| May 22 || vs. San Diego* || – || Banner Island Ballpark || TheW.tv || 4–5 || Anthony McIver (3–2) || Kolton Mahoney (4–8) || None || 962 || 28–25 || –
|-

|-
| style="font-size:88%" | Rankings from Collegiate Baseball. Parenthesis indicate tournament seedings.
|-
| style="font-size:88%" | *West Coast Conference games
|-
| style="font-size:88%" | y- BYU was considered the home team despite playing in Moraga because the game was originally scheduled to be played in Provo.

Radio Information
Every BYU Baseball game had a radio/internet broadcast available. 33 games were broadcast on KOVO with Brent Norton (play-by-play) calling the games for his 26th consecutive season. A rotating selection of analysts was used. 14 of the games were simulcast on BYU Radio. BYU Radio also had 4 radio exclusives this season: Mar 6 late night & Mar 7 vs. Hartford & Apr 7 & 28 vs. Utah Valley. Robbie Bullough provided play by play for BYU Radio's exclusive games vs. Hartford as well as the Apr. 28 game at Utah Valley. He also sat in on a couple of games Brent Norton was unable to make. The Apr. 7 Utah Valley game was a BYUtv simulcast.

UC Santa Barbara, Nebraska, Oklahoma, Utah Valley, and Cal State Northridge all provided an internet broadcast through their respective athletic websites.

TV Announcers
March 5: Hartford- Brent Norton & Jeff Bills
March 6: Hartford, Game 1- Brent Norton & Randy Wilstead
March 6: Hartford, Game 2- Robbie Bullough & Marc Oslund
March 7: Hartford- Robbie Bullough & Marc Oslund
March 10: @ Utah Valley- No announcers
March 12: Pepperdine- Spencer Linton & Gary Sheide
March 13: Pepperdine- Spencer Linton & Gary Sheide
March 14: Pepperdine- Spencer Linton & Gary Sheide
March 19: @ Gonzaga- No announcers
March 20: @ Gonzaga- No announcers
March 21: @ Gonzaga- No announcers
March 24: @ Utah- JB Long & Kevin Stocker
March 26: @ San Diego- Jack Murray & John Cunningham
March 27: @ San Diego- Jack Murray & John Cunningham
March 28: @ San Diego- Jack Murray & John Cunningham
March 30: @ San Diego State- Chris Elow
April 2: Portland- Dave McCann & Gary Sheide
April 3: Portland- Spencer Linton & Gary Sheide
April 4: Portland– Brent Norton & Jeff Bills
April 7: Utah Valley- Spencer Linton & Gary Sheide
April 9: @ Loyola Marymount- Chris Turkmany & Derek Georgino
April 10: @ Loyola Marymount- Justin Alderson
April 11: @ Loyola Marymount- Dalton Green
April 21: Utah- Dave McCann & Gary Sheide
April 23: San Francisco- Spencer Linton & Gary Sheide
April 24: San Francisco- Spencer Linton & Gary Sheide
April 25: San Francisco- Brent Norton & Randy Wilstead
April 28: @ Utah Valley- Jordan Bianucci & James Warnick
April 30: @ Pacific- Paul Muyskens
May 1: @ Pacific- Justin Alderson
May 2: @ Pacific- Ricky Garcia
May 7: Saint Mary's- Spencer Linton & Gary Sheide
May 8: Saint Mary's- Spencer Linton & Gary Sheide
May 9: Saint Mary's- Dave McCann & Gary Sheide- Game rained out
May 12: @ Utah- JB Long & Jerry Kindall
May 14: @ Santa Clara- David Gentile & Collin Baker
May 15: @ Santa Clara- No announcers
May 16: @ Santa Clara- No announcers
May 18: Saint Mary's in Moraga- Dean Boerner & Daniel Conmy
May 21: Pepperdine- Justin Alderson & Frank Cruz
May 22: San Diego- Justin Alderson & Frank Cruz

See also 
2015 BYU Cougars softball team
2015 BYU Cougars men's volleyball team

References 

2015 West Coast Conference baseball season
2015
2015 in sports in Utah